Maryam Abdulhadi Al-Khawaja (b. 26 June 1987) is a Bahraini human rights activist. She is the daughter of the Bahraini human rights activist Abdulhadi al-Khawaja and former co-director of the Gulf Center for Human Rights (GCHR). She is currently the Special Advisor on Advocacy with the GCHR, and works as a consultant with NGOs. She's a board member of the International Service for Human Rights and No Hiding Place. She serves as the Vice Chair on the Board of the Urgent Action Fund.

Early life 
Al-Khawaja was born in Syria to mother, Khadija Almousawi, and Bahraini-Danish human rights activist Abdulhadi Al-Khawaja. Her father had been wanted in Bahrain since the mid-1980s. At the age of two her family obtained political asylum in Denmark. They lived there until 2001, when they were allowed re-entry into Bahrain.

After graduating from the University of Bahrain in 2009, Al-Khawaja spent a year in the United States on a Fulbright scholarship at Brown University. When she returned to Bahrain in mid-2010, however, she was unable to find work in public relations or education due to her father's human rights work. Instead she joined the Bahrain Centre for Human Rights, co-founded by her father, where she headed the foreign relations office and became vice president, serving as acting president during BCHR's president, Nabeel Rajab's, periods of detention.

On 22 June 2011, Al-Khawaja’s father was sentenced to life imprisonment in a military court on the charge of "organizing and managing a terrorist organization" for his role in the pro-democracy 2011-2012 Bahraini uprising.

Career

Human rights activism 
Al-Khawaja was active in participating in protests and volunteering for human rights organizations since she was a young teenager. She also worked as a fixer and translator for journalists who came to Bahrain to report on the situation there. In 2006, Al-Khawaja was part of the delegation that went to the UN building in New York City and met with the Secretary-General’s assistant to hand over the mass petition of demanding that the Prime Minister resign, due to his human rights violations. In 2008, Al-Khawaja was invited by the Tom Lantos Human Rights Commission to testify at US Congress about religious freedom in Bahrain. The government led a smear campaign in the media against the group of activists that spoke at this session including Al-Khawaja, and their case was adopted by organizations such as Frontline, OMCT and FIDH.

Involvement in the Bahraini uprising

After actively participating in the organizing of the early pro-democracy demonstrations in 2011, Al-Khawaja embarked on an overseas speaking tour at colleges and conferences. During this tour, she held meetings with UK politicians, and spoke to the United Nations Human Rights Council in Geneva. With Nabeel Rajab prevented from leaving Bahrain, problems of access for the external media and at least 500 leading members of the opposition detained, al-Khawaja assumed a prominent public role outside Bahrain. According to Joe Stork of Human Rights Watch, BCHR recommended that she stay abroad given the likelihood of arrest if she returned.

In April, al-Khawaja participated in the U.S.-Islamic World Forum, where she was able to speak to then Secretary of State Hillary Clinton and tell the story of her father and two brothers in-law arrest. She implored Clinton for the United States to take a stronger stance against the oppression in Bahrain, and cited the Bahraini government's use of American weapons to suppress the protesters, as a reason for the United States to do. In May, she spoke to the Oslo Freedom Forum about her experiences with government violence in Bahrain. On 13 May, she gave evidence to a U.S. Congress hearing on Human Rights in Bahrain.

Online activity
Before the Bahraini uprising, Al-Khawaja was not active on Twitter, with no more than 30 followers. As of September 2017, she has more than 109,900 followers and had sent more than 51,000 tweets, providing  real-time coverage of various protests oft overlooked by many formal news agencies. As demonstrators flooded the streets, she stayed for days on end in Manama's Pearl Roundabout actively tweeting.

Threats and harassment
Al-Khawaja has faced internet harassment from regime supporters. She did not attend an IFEX in Lebanon in early June after receiving death threats. Immediately after her speech to the Oslo Freedom Forum (streamed live online) a Twitter campaign began, accusing her of spreading false news, being a radical and working for the Iranian government. Many messages accusing Al-Khawaja of being a "traitor" for Bahrain were sent to the email account of Oslo Freedom Forum. Much of the tweeting, blogging and online harassment has originated in the U.S., inside the Geo-Political Solutions division of Qorvis Communications. The campaign has also included apparently organized heckling.

According to FIDH, in early May 2011, an anonymous smear campaign was launched against Nabeel Rajab and Al-Khawaja "with the active support of the Bahraini authorities."

On August 30, 2014, while traveling to visit her father in Manama, Al-Khawaja was arrested and charged with assaulting a police officer. She was released on bail and left Bahrain on October 2, 2014, boycotting her trial. In December, she was sentenced in absentia to one year in prison. Bahrain maintains that al-Khawaja's arrest is valid. She currently has an outstanding arrest warrant, and has four pending cases, one of which is filed under the Terrorism Law and could carry a life sentence or the death penalty.

References

External links
 

1987 births
Living people
Human rights in Bahrain
People of the Bahraini uprising of 2011
Bahraini human rights activists
Bahraini activists
Bahraini women activists
Bahraini dissidents
University of Bahrain alumni
Women human rights activists
Fulbright alumni